Katerina Mileska (born 24 February 1989) is a Macedonian footballer who plays as a defender for 1. liga club ŽFK Kočani and the North Macedonia women's national team.

References

1989 births
Living people
Women's association football defenders
Macedonian women's footballers
North Macedonia women's international footballers